Lost River Delta is a "port-of-call" (themed land) at Tokyo DisneySea in the Tokyo Disney Resort. It presents an archaeological site in a tropical rainforest of Central America in the 1930s.

Theme
Lost River Delta is the farthest "themed land" from the entrance of Tokyo DisneySea. The landmark of this area is an ancient Aztec pyramid. The thrill ride Indiana Jones Adventure: Temple of the Crystal Skull, which is based on Lucasfilm's Indiana Jones film series, operates in the pyramid.

Attractions and entertainment

Current
 DisneySea Transit Steamer Line
 Indiana Jones Adventure: Temple of the Crystal Skull
 Raging Spirits
 Hangar Stage- Mystic Rhythms (2001-2015), Out of Shadowland (2016-2019), Song of Mirage (2019-2020), Tokyo DisneySea 20th "Shining with You" (April-September 2022)

Restaurants and refreshments
 Expedition Eats
 Lost River Cookhouse
 Miguel's El Dorado Cantina
 Tropic Al's
 Yucatan Base Camp Grill

Shopping
 Expedition Photo Archives
 Lookout Traders
 Lost River Outfitters
 Peddlers' Outpost

References

 
Themed areas in Walt Disney Parks and Resorts
Tokyo DisneySea